Jason Kila (born 15 January 1990) is a Papua New Guinean cricketer.  Kila is a left-handed batsman who bowls slow left-arm orthodox.  He was born in Port Moresby.

Having played age group cricket for Papua New Guinea Under-19s in the 2008 Under-19 World Cup and 2010 Under-19 World Cup, he proceeded to be selected as a part of the Papua New Guinea squad for the 2011 World Cricket League Division Three, where he played 5 matches, helping them earn promotion to 2011 World Cricket League Division Two.  It was in this competition that he made his List A debut against Namibia.  He played a further 3 List A matches in the competition, the last coming against Hong Kong.  In his 4 matches, he scored 75 runs at a batting average of 18.75, with a high score 36.  With the ball, he took a single wickets at an overall competition cost of 57 runs.

International career
He made his One Day International (ODI) debut for Papua New Guinea against the United Arab Emirates in the 2018 Cricket World Cup Qualifier on 4 March 2018. 
In August 2018, he was named in Papua New Guinea's squad for Group A of the 2018–19 ICC World Twenty20 East Asia-Pacific Qualifier tournament.

In March 2019, he was named in Papua New Guinea's squad for the Regional Finals of the 2018–19 ICC World Twenty20 East Asia-Pacific Qualifier tournament. He made his Twenty20 International (T20I) debut for Papua New Guinea against the Philippines on 22 March 2019. The following month, he was named in Papua New Guinea's squad for the 2019 ICC World Cricket League Division Two tournament in Namibia.

In September 2019, he was named in Papua New Guinea's squad for the 2019 ICC T20 World Cup Qualifier tournament in the United Arab Emirates. In August 2021, Kila was named in Papua New Guinea's squad for the 2021 ICC Men's T20 World Cup.

References

External links

1990 births
Living people
People from the National Capital District (Papua New Guinea)
Papua New Guinean cricketers
Papua New Guinea One Day International cricketers
Papua New Guinea Twenty20 International cricketers